Ellwood may refer to:

People
Ellwood (surname) 
Ellwood (given name)

Places
 Ellwood City, Pennsylvania
 Ellwood, Gloucestershire
 Ellwood, Ottawa
 Ellwood Oil Field, Goleta, California
 Ellwood (Leesburg, Virginia), a historic house

Music
 Ellwood (band), a band from Solvang, California

See also
 Elwood (disambiguation)